is a Japanese tarento and actress. She is a former member of the Japanese idol girl group AKB48. She was born from Tokyo. She is represented with One Eight Promotion.

Participating songs with AKB48

Single CD selection music

Theatre unit songs

Works

Videos

Filmography

Films

Television

Concerts

Stage

Radio

Video games

Internet

Internet programmes

Bibliography

Photo albums

Calendars

Trading cards

References

External links
 – One Eight Promotion 
 (14 Sep 2013 – ) 
 (Natsumi Hirajima's entries, – 26 Jan 2012) 

Japanese idols
Japanese stage actresses
AKB48 members
1992 births
Living people
Singers from Tokyo
21st-century Japanese women singers
21st-century Japanese singers
21st-century Japanese actresses